Events in 1971 in Japanese television.

Debuts

Ongoing shows
Music Fair, music (1964-present)
Key Hunter, drama (1968–1973)
Mito Kōmon, jidaigeki (1969-2011)
Sazae-san, anime (1969-present)
Inakappe Taishō, anime (1970–1972)
Ōedo Sōsamō, jidaigeki (1970-1984)
Ōoka Echizen, jidaigeki (1970-1999)

Endings

See also
1971 in anime
1971 in Japan
List of Japanese films of 1971

References